Aspartate aminotransferase, mitochondrial is an enzyme that in humans is encoded by the GOT2 gene. Glutamic-oxaloacetic transaminase is a pyridoxal phosphate-dependent enzyme which exists in cytoplasmic and inner-membrane mitochondrial forms, GOT1 and GOT2, respectively. GOT plays a role in amino acid metabolism and the urea and Kreb's cycle. Also, GOT2 is a major participant in the malate-aspartate shuttle, which is a passage from the cytosol to the mitochondria. The two enzymes are homodimeric and show close homology. GOT2 has been seen to have a role in cell proliferation, especially in terms of tumor growth.

Structure 

GOT2 is a dimer containing two identical subunits that hold overlapping subunit regions. The top and sides of the enzyme are made up of helices, while the bottom is formed by strands of beta sheets and extended hairpin loops. The subunit itself can be categorized into four different parts: a large domain, which binds pyridoxal-P, a small domain, an NH2-terminal arm, and a bridge across two domains, which is formed by residues 48-75 and 301-358. Virtually ubiquitous in eukaryotic cells, GOT2 nucleic acid and protein sequences are highly conserved, and its 5’regulatory regions in genomic DNA resemble those of typical house-keeping genes in that, e.g., they lack a TATA box. The GOT2 gene is also located on 16q21 and has an exon count of 10.

Function 

In order to produce the energy needed for everyday activities, our body needs to go through the process of glycolysis, which breaks down glucose into pyruvate. In this pathway, one very important part is the reduction of NAD+ to NADH and then the rapid oxidation of NADH back into NAD+. The oxidation phase mainly occurs in the mitochondria as part of the electron transport chain, but the transfer of NADH into the mitochondria from the cytosol is impossible, due to the impermeability of the inner mitochondrial membrane to NADH. Therefore, the malate-aspartate shuttle is needed to transfer reducing equivalents across the mitochondrial membrane for energy production. GOT2 and another enzyme, MDH, are essential for the functioning of the shuttle. GOT2 converts oxaloacetate into aspartate by transamination. This aspartate as well as alpha-ketoglutarate return into the cytosol, which is then converted back to oxaloacetate and glutamate, respectively.

Another function of GOT2 is that it is believed to transaminate kynurenine into kynurenic acid (KYNA) in the brain. The KYNA made by the GOT2 is thought to be an important factor in brain pathology. It is suggested that KYNA synthesized by GOT2 could constitute a common, and mechanistically relevant, feature of the neurotoxicity caused by mitochondrial poisons, such as rotenone, malonate, 1-methyl-4-phenylpyridinium, and 3-nitropropionic acid.

Clinical Significance
In nearly all cancer cells, glycolysis has been seen to be highly elevated to meet their increased energy, biosynthesis, and redox needs. Therefore, the malate-aspartate shuttle promotes the net transfer of cytosolic NADH into mitochondria to ensure a high rate of glycolysis in diverse cancer cell lines. In a study completed in 2008, inhibiting the malate-aspartate shuttle was found to impair the glycolysis process and essentially decreased breast adenocarcinoma cell proliferation. Furthermore, knocking down GOT2 and GOT1 has also been reported to inhibit cell proliferation and colony formation in pancreatic cancer cell lines, suggesting that the GOT enzyme is essential for maintaining a high rate of glycolysis to support rapid tumor cell growth. Also, both glucose and glutamine increase GOT2 3K acetylation in PANC-1 cells and that GOT2 3K acetylation plays a critical role in coordinating glucose and glutamine uptake to provide energy and support cell proliferation and tumor growth. This implies that inhibiting GOT2 3K acetylation may merit exploration as a therapeutic agent especially for pancreatic cancer.

Mutations in this gene have been associated with an early onset infantile encephalopathy.

Interactions 

GOT2 has been seen to interact with:
 oxaloacetate
 kynurenine
 aspartate
 alpha-ketoglutarate

Interactive pathway map

References

Further reading 

 
 
 
 
 
 
 
 
 
 
 
 
 
 
 

Mitochondrial proteins